Y Combinator (YC) is an American technology startup accelerator launched in March 2005. It has been used to launch more than 4,000 companies, including Airbnb, Coinbase, Cruise, DoorDash, Dropbox, Instacart, Quora, PagerDuty, Reddit, Stripe and Twitch. The combined valuation of the top YC companies was more than $600 billion by January 2023. The company's accelerator program started in Boston and Mountain View, expanded to San Francisco in 2019, and was entirely online during the COVID-19 pandemic.  Forbes characterized the company in 2012 as one of the most successful startup accelerators in Silicon Valley.

History

Y Combinator was founded in 2005 by Paul Graham, Jessica Livingston, Robert Tappan Morris, and Trevor Blackwell.

From 2005 to 2008, one program was in Cambridge, Massachusetts, and one was in Mountain View, California. As Y Combinator grew to 40 investments per year, running two programs became too much. In January 2009, Y Combinator announced that the Cambridge program would be closed and all future programs would be in Silicon Valley.

In 2009, Sequoia Capital led the $2 million investment round into an entity of Y Combinator to enable it to invest in approximately 60 companies a year. In 2010, Sequoia led an $8.25 million funding round for Y Combinator to further increase the number of startups the company could fund.

In 2011, Yuri Milner and SV Angel offered every Y Combinator company a $150,000 convertible note investment. The amount put into each company was changed to $80,000 when Start Fund was renewed.

In September 2013, Y Combinator began funding nonprofit organizations that were accepted into the program after testing the concept with Watsi.

In 2014, Sam Altman replaced Graham as president of Y Combinator. In 2014, Y Combinator began a new deal for startups, offering $150,000 for 7 percent equity.

In 2014, Altman announced a partnership with Transcriptic to provide increased support for Y Combinator's growing community of biotech companies. In 2015, he announced a partnership with Bolt and increased support for hardware companies.

The YC Fellowship Program was announced in July 2015, with the goal of funding companies at the idea or prototype stage. The first batch of YC Fellowship included 32 companies that received an equity-free grant instead of an investment.

In January 2016, Y Combinator changed the fellowship program, with participating companies receiving $20k investment for a 1.5 percent equity stake. The equity stake is structured as a convertible security that converts into shares only if a company has an initial public offering (IPO), or a funding event or acquisition that values the company at $100 million or more. The fellowship was discontinued in 2017.

In 2016, Y Combinator announced that YC partners would visit 11 countries to meet with founders and learn more about how they could be helpful to international startup communities. Those 11 countries were Nigeria, Denmark, Portugal, Sweden, Germany, Russia, Argentina, Chile, Mexico, Israel, and India.

Former Twitter chief financial officer and chief operating officer Ali Rowghani, who was in charge of the YC Continuity Fund when it began, became CEO of YC Continuity. Michael Seibel, who co-founded Justin.tv, became CEO of YC Core, the program that Paul Buchheit had run since 2016.

In 2017, Y Combinator began Startup School, an online course that released public videos and coached individual startups. More than 1500 startups graduated the program in its first year.

In 2018, Y Combinator announced a new batch of startup school. After a software glitch, all 15,000 startups that applied to the program were accepted, only to learn a few hours later that they had been rejected. But the ensuing outcry led Y Combinator to change course again and decided over an official blog to accept all those 15,000 companies. Now, every company is accepted to join YC Startup School without any restrictions.

In 2019, Geoff Ralston replaced Altman as president of Y Combinator.

In January 2022, YC announced a new standard deal of $500,000 ($125,000 for 7% and an additional $375,000 on an uncapped safe with an MFN).

The summer 2020 batch was conducted remotely via videotelephony due to the COVID-19 pandemic.

In the summer of 2022, Y Combinator intentionally shrunk the number of startups within its accelerator down 40% from 414 companies to 250 companies.

In January 2023, Garry Tan returned to YC as president and CEO.

Programs
Y Combinator interviews and selects two batches of companies per year. The companies receive a total of $500,000 in seed money as well as advice, and connections. The $500,000 in funding is made up of $125,000 on a post-money S.A.F.E in return for 7% equity and $375,000 on an uncapped S.A.F.E. with a most favored nation (MFN) provision. Non-profits receive a $100,000 donation. The program includes "office hours", where startup founders meet individually and participate in group meetings. Founders also participate in weekly meetups where guests from the Silicon Valley ecosystem (successful entrepreneurs, venture capitalists, etc.) speak to the founders.

Y Combinator's motto is "Make Something People Want." The program teaches founders how to market their product, refine their teams and business models, achieve product/market fit, and scale the startup into a high growth business, etc. The program ends with Demo Day, where startups present their business and technology prototypes to potential investors.

Y Combinator operates additional programs and a fund designed to support and invest in startups which have already graduated from the main accelerator program. The Series A Program, YC Post-A Program, YC Growth Program, and YC Continuity fund are operated by the same team and focus on helping fast growing YC startups, and startups raising their Series B funding of $20 million to $100 million.

Y Combinator has introduced additional programs since 2015, including:

 In July 2015, Y Combinator introduced the YC Fellowship Program aimed at companies at an earlier stage than the main program.
 In October 2015, Y Combinator introduced the YC Continuity Fund. The fund allows Y Combinator to make pro rata investments in their alumni companies with valuations under $300 million. Y Combinator will also consider leading or participating in later stage growth financing rounds for YC companies.
 Nonprofit research lab YC Research was announced in October 2015. Researchers are paid as full-time employees and can receive equity in Y Combinator. OpenAI was the first project undertaken by YC Research, and in January 2016 a second study on basic income was also announced. Another project is research on new cities. Australian quantum physicist Michael Nielsen is a research fellow at YC Research since 2017.
 In October 2015, YC introduced YC Research to fund long-term fundamental research. YC President Sam Altman donated $10m.
During 2017–2019, YC launched Startup School, the Series A program, the YC Growth program, Work at a Startup, and YC China.
In March 2019, it was reported that Y Combinator was moving headquarters to San Francisco.

As of late 2021, Y Combinator had invested in >3,000 companies, most of which are for-profit. Non-profit organizations can also participate in the main YC program. Few non-profits have been accepted in the last years, among them Watsi, Women Who Code, New Story, SIRUM, Zidisha, 80,000 Hours, and Our World in Data.

People
Y Combinator was founded in March 2005 by Paul Graham, Jessica Livingston, Robert Morris and Trevor Blackwell.

In 2010, Kirsty Nathoo joined as an accountant and became CFO in 2012.

In early 2010, Harj Taggar joined as an advisor. In September 2010, Alexis Ohanian joined. In November 2010, Paul Buchheit and Harj Taggar were named partners. In 2015, Taggar left YC. Taggar returned to YC in 2020 as a group partner.

In January 2011, Garry Tan joined YC, first as designer-in-residence and later as partner. He left YC in November 2015.

 Later in 2011, Aaron Iba joined as a partner.

In February 2014, Sam Altman became president of Y Combinator.

Michael Seibel joined Y Combinator as part-time partner in January 2013 and later became a full-time Partner in 2014.

The company includes managing directors, group partners, visiting group partners and team members as listed on its website.

In 2018, Y Combinator announced that Lu Qi, a former CEO of Baidu and Bing, would join the company as CEO of YC China. Y Combinator announced that Lu left YC in November 2019 and that it had decided not to pursue a program in China.

In March 2019, Y Combinator announced its president Sam Altman would be transitioning into a chairman position to focus more on OpenAI and Geoff Ralston would be the new president.

In January 2022, Garry Tan returned to YC as president and CEO.

Controversies

Y Combinator has been blamed for its encouragement of the ageism culture in Silicon Valley. Paul Graham said in 2005 that people over 38 lacked the energy to launch startups. It was also at a Y Combinator event, the 2007 Startup School, that Mark Zuckerberg said, "Young people are just smarter". Research on this issue published by Harvard Business Review found Y Combinator's views to be misguided, as the average age of a successful startup founder was found to be 45 years old.

Open Research project
The Human Advancement Research Community (HARC) project was set up with the "mission to ensure human wisdom exceeds human power". The project was inspired by a conversation between Sam Altman and Alan Kay. Its projects include modelling, visualizing and teaching software, as well as programming languages. Members included Alan Kay, Bret Victor, and Vi Hart. Patrick Scaglia was chair of HARC and was listed as an advisor in 2017. YC Research disaffiliated with Y Combinator and now operates as Open Research.

See also
 500 Startups
 Entrepreneurs Roundtable Accelerator
 Hacker News
 HighTechXL
 List of Y Combinator startups
 Techstars

References

External links

 
 Wonderful Performance, formerly Y Combinator China

 
Business incubators of the United States
Startup accelerators
Venture capital firms of the United States
Financial services companies based in California
Companies based in Mountain View, California
Financial services companies established in 2005
2005 establishments in California